The Society of Montana Pioneers was founded on September 11, 1884, in Helena, Montana, to honor and document the histories of Montana pioneers who were resident in the territory at the time it became a Montana Territory, May 26, 1864. In 1909, the society changed its membership rules to admit pioneers who were resident the territory prior to December 31, 1868. In 1899, the society boasted 1536 active members out of a one time total of 1808. The society did not consider individuals who were assigned to Montana on military duties, individuals who were deemed outlaws such as Henry Plummer of Bannack, or Indians as eligible for membership in the society.

On August 18, 1892, a junior society was founded—The Sons and Daughters of Montana Pioneers—to perpetuate the tradition of the pioneers by their progeny.

History
In the summer of 1884, many Montana pioneers were unsatisfied with the Montana Historical Society and its more formal approach to the preservation of Montana History. In response, they decided to form a more populist society and made this call:

By September 1884, sufficient numbers of pioneers had committed to forming the society. A meeting was scheduled on September 10, 1884, at the Court House in Helena, Montana. Sixty-six pioneers from eleven Montana counties signed the notice.

County societies
Society members living in Montana counties with a large number of members formed local county orgy sessions.
 Pioneers' Society of Beaverhead County–1887
 Gallatin County Pioneer Society No. 1–November 23, 1893
 Jefferson County Society of Pioneers of the State of Montana–December 10, 1897
 Lewis and Clarke [sic] County Society of Montana Pioneers–1897
 Pioneer Society of Madison County–1888
 The Teton County Society of Montana Pioneers–January 23, 1895

Officers

1884–1899 
1900–1961
 1884
 President: James Fergus
 Recording Secretary: George W. Irvin, II
 Corresponding Secretary: Wilbur F. Sanders
 Treasurer: Samuel T. Hauser
 1885
 President: Walter W. DeLacy
 Recording Secretary: John Russell Wilson
 Corresponding Secretary: Cornelius Hedges
 1886
 President: Granville Stuart
 Recording Secretary: James U. Sanders
 Corresponding Secretary: Cornelius Hedges
 Treasurer: Samuel T. Hauser
 1887
 President: Frank H. Woody
 Secretary: James U. Sanders 
 Treasurer: Samuel T. Hauser
 1888
 President: Wilbur F. Sanders
 Secretary: Cornelius Hedges
 Treasurer: Samuel T. Hauser
 1889
 President: Anton M. Holter
 Secretary: Cornelius Hedges
 Treasurer: Theodore H. Kleinschmidt
 1890
 President: William A. Clark
 Secretary: Cornelius Hedges 
 Treasurer: Henry M. Parchen
 1891
 President: Samuel Word
 Secretary: Cornelius Hedges
 Treasurer: Theodore H. Kleinschmidt
 1892
 President: Walter Cooper
 Secretary: Charles D. Curtis
 Treasurer: Cornelius Hedges
 1893
 President: Walter Cooper
 Secretary: Charles D. Curtis
 Treasurer: Cornelius Hedges
 1894
 President: John T. Conner
 Secretary: Charles D. Curtis
 Treasurer: Theodore H. Kleinschmidt
 1895
 President: Conrad Kohrs
 Secretary: Theophilus Muffly
 Treasurer: Theodore H. Kleinschmidt
 1896
 President: William L. Steele
 Secretary: Theophilus Muffly
 Treasurer: Theodore H. Kleinschmidt
 1897
 President: Nickolas Kessler
 Secretary: Theophilus Muffly
 Treasurer: Theodore H. Kleinschmidt
 1898
 President: Henry Elling
 Secretary: James U. Sanders
 Treasurer: Anton M. Holter
 1899
 President: Henry Elling
 Secretary: James U. Sanders
 Treasurer: Anton M. Holter
1900–President: Henry F. Edgar 
1901–President: Augustus F. Graeter 
1902–President: Timothy E. Collins
1903–President: O'Dillon Whitford
1904–President: Cornelius Hedges
1905–President: John P. Thomas 
1906–President: Paul McCormick 
1907–President: Charles S. Warren 
1908–President: Andrew J. Fisk 
1909–President: Warren C. Gillette 
1910–President: William Y. Pemberton 
1911–President: Rod D. Leggat 
1912–President: Mortimer H. Lott 
1913–President: Martin Maginnis  
1914–President: James M. Page 
1915–President: John W. Blair 
1916–President: George W. Morse 
1917–President: Frank D. Brown 
1918–President: Charles W. Hoffman 
1919–President: William A. Clark 
1920–President: John F. Bishop 
1921–President: Charles W. Cook
1922–President: William A. Coleman
1923–President: Richard Lockey
1924–President: Thomas R. Moore 
1925–President: Mary Valiton 
1926–President: Alfred W. Orton 
1927–President: Patrick Carney and Mrs. M. F. Trask
1928–President: Wylls A. Hedges
1929–President: Molly Kline 
1930–President: David Heilgn
1931–President: W. C. Cerron 
1932–President: Miles Cavanaugh
1933–President: Merling Held
1934–President: Henry Evans
1935–President: Augusta Trask 
1936–President: Andrew Erickson 
1937–President: John H. Miller 
1938–President: Will Cave 
1940–President: Jeannie Ennis Chowing
1941–President: Mary Evans 
1942–President: Joseph Larson
1943–President: Joseph Larson
1944–President: Augusta Trask 
1945–President: William L. Milligan 
1946–President: Henry M. Morgan
1947–President: William K. Burns 
1948–President: Julia R. Elledge 
1949–President: Mary Doane (wife of Gustavus Cheyney Doane)
1950–President: Byron Wickham 
1951–President: Lumen W. Allen
1952–President: Tom H. McCauley 
1953–President: Fannie Davis Ennis
1954–President: Fannie Davis Ennis 
1955–President: Helen Allen Conrad 
1956–President: Henry R. Daems
1957–President: Julie Mae Stock
1958–President: Julie Mae Stock
1959–President: Josephine Gilg 
1960–President: Luman Allen
1961–President: Luman Allen

Sons and Daughters of Montana Pioneers
On August 18, 1892, during their annual meeting, the Montana Pioneers established The Sons and Daughters of Montana Pioneers as a society to preserve the legacy of the original pioneers. Membership in the society is open to any linear descendants of the original members of the Society of Montana Pioneers. The Sons and Daughters Society was instrumental in obtaining land for the construction of the Veterans and Pioneer Memorial Building at the state capitol in Helena. The records of both societies are maintained there.

Publications
In 1899, James U. Sanders, long-time secretary of the society and the Montana Historical Society librarian organized the publication of Volume I of Society of Montana Pioneers-Constitution, Members, Officers with Portraits and Maps... The volume details the foundation of the society, lists the officers up to 1898 along with details of the various country societies. It includes short biographical sketches of members from each county. Other than short newspaper articles, the society did not publish another volume.

In 2001, under the editorial leadership of Linda Wostrel, Historian of The Sons and Daughters of Montana Pioneers, a volume of 91 biographical remembrances was published under the title: Dreams Across The Divide-Stories of Montana Pioneers with a foreword by Stephen Ambrose, author of Undaunted Courage: Meriwether Lewis, Thomas Jefferson, and the Opening of the American West (1996).

Dissolution
On August 24–25, 1962, during their 78th annual meeting, held in Butte, the eight surviving members of the society and The Sons and Daughters of Montana Pioneers elected to dissolve the original society. Lumen W. Allen, the last survivor of the Society of Montana Pioneers died on February 19, 1970, at the age of 102 in Butte.

Notes

1884 establishments in Montana Territory
History of Montana
Historical societies in Montana
State history organizations of the United States